Murder by Numbers is a 2002 American psychological thriller film produced and directed by Barbet Schroeder and starring Sandra Bullock in the main role, Ben Chaplin, Ryan Gosling, and Michael Pitt. It is loosely based on the Leopold and Loeb case. The film was screened at the 2002 Cannes Film Festival, but was not entered in competition.

Plot 
Richard Haywood (Ryan Gosling) and Justin Pendleton (Michael Pitt) are high school classmates; Richard is wealthy and popular, while Justin is a brilliant introvert. After months of planning a "perfect crime," they abduct a woman at random, strangle her, and plant evidence implicating Richard's marijuana dealer, janitor Ray Feathers. Detective Cassie Mayweather (Sandra Bullock) and her new partner Sam Kennedy (Ben Chaplin) investigate. Cassie has sex with Sam early on as she had with previous partners, but won't let him see her chest, and curtly sends him home afterwards.

Footprints at the crime scene lead to Richard, and vomit nearby implicates Justin. Both have alibis, and deny knowing each other, but Cassie is convinced that Richard is the murderer and Justin is involved. Sam criticizes her refusal to consider other suspects, as most of the physical evidence points away from the two boys. Cassie's boss, Captain Rod Cody, and her ex, Assistant D.A. Al Swanson, fearing Richard's influential parents, take Cassie off the case. Richard kills Ray, and makes it appear like a suicide. Sam, following the planted evidence, tracks down Ray. When he finds Ray dead, the woman's murder appears solved; but Sam decides that Cassie may be right, and continues the investigation.

Justin, who has a crush on classmate Lisa Mills, works up the courage to ask her out. A jealous Richard seduces Lisa, then gives Justin a video clip of them having sex. Justin is enraged, but regains control, knowing Sam is still watching them. Cassie begins receiving calls from her ex-husband Carl Hudson, who went to prison for stabbing her in the chest 17 times. His parole hearing is coming up, and he wants her to speak on his behalf. Cassie confides to Sam that although she became a cop to prove to herself that she wasn't a victim, she is terrified at the prospect of seeing Carl again. She also confesses that Richard reminds her of Carl, which is why she is convinced of Richard's guilt, and obsessed with proving it.

Sam and Cassie bring Richard and Justin in for separate interrogations, trying to induce them to implicate each other, but neither of them talk, and both are released. At the victim's home, Cassie determines how the boys carried out the abduction and altered the physical evidence. Justin and Richard, knowing that Cassie is closing in on them, flee to an abandoned house, where Richard produces two revolvers and proposes a mutual suicide. On the count of three, Justin shoots into the air, but Richard does not. Justin demands to see Richard's gun, which is unloaded. As a furious Justin is about to shoot Richard, Cassie arrives. Richard grabs Justin's gun and shoots at Cassie, wounding Justin instead. Cassie gives chase, but Richard strangles her on a rickety balcony jutting out over a cliff. Cassie gains the upper hand and knocks Richard off the balcony; he falls to his death. Justin grabs Cassie, who is hanging on the edge of the balcony, and pulls her back into the house.

Cassie assures Justin that she will intercede on his behalf, since he was an innocent dupe, manipulated by the ruthless Richard. Then she notices a mark on her neck caused by Richard's large ring, and realizes that the dead woman's neck did not have a similar mark. Confronted with the evidence, Justin confesses that he strangled the victim, proving his "courage" to Richard, and is arrested.

Cassie faces her fears and enters the courtroom to testify at Carl's parole hearing. The bailiff calls her to the stand by her legal name: Jessica Marie Hudson.

Cast 
 Sandra Bullock as Det. Cassie Mayweather / Jessica Marie Hudson
 Ben Chaplin as Det. Sam Kennedy
 Ryan Gosling as Richard Haywood
 Michael Pitt as Justin Pendleton
 Agnes Bruckner as Lisa Mills
 Chris Penn as Ray Feathers
 R. D. Call as Capt. Rod Cody
 Tom Verica as A.D.A. Al Swanson

Reception

Box office 
The film was released April 19, 2002 in the United States and Canada and grossed $9.3 million in 2,663 theaters its opening weekend, ranking #3 at the box office. The film grossed a total of $56,714,147 worldwide — $31,945,749 in the United States and Canada and $24,768,398 in other territories.

Critical reception 
Reviews for the film were generally mixed. The review aggregator website Rotten Tomatoes reported that 31% of critics have given the film a positive review based on 128 reviews, with an average rating of 5.30/10. The site's critics consensus reads, "A predictable police procedural that works better as a character study rather than a thriller." On Metacritic, the film has a weighted average score of 50 out of 100 based on 35 critics, indicating "mixed or average reviews".

Roger Ebert awarded three stars out of a possible four, stating: "Bullock does a good job here of working against her natural likability, creating a character you'd like to like, and could like, if she weren't so sad, strange and turned in upon herself. She throws herself into police work not so much because she's dedicated as because she needs the distraction, needs to keep busy and be good to assure herself of her worth. As she draws the net closer, and runs into more danger and more official opposition, the movie more or less helplessly starts thinking to itself about that cliff above the sea, but at least the climax shows us that Bullock can stay in character no matter what."

A. O. Scott, writing for The New York Times, said that "much of this new Barbet Schroeder film -- a star vehicle for Sandra Bullock, who is also an executive producer -- follows well-worn paths of the cops-and-psycho-killer routine." He describes Haywood and Pendleton as "a pair of teenage Nietzsche-heads who might be appearing in a remake of Alfred Hitchcock's Rope for The WB network." Scott adds,

The real surprise, given the secondhand material, is that not everything proceeds by rote in Murder by Numbers, which opens today [19 April 2002] nationwide. The rickety structure of the movie's main plot sustains some clammy and fascinating psychological inquiry, and one suspects that, as in Single White Female, Mr. Schroeder's interest is less in the story than in the possibilities it affords for exercising his perverse, chilly curiosity about power, intimacy and the varieties of human distress. This movie is most interesting as a study of two parallel relationships, neither one primarily sexual (though sexuality is the subtext of one and the half-accidental consequence of the other), but both saturated with enough longing, envy, tenderness and loathing to make actual sex a bit redundant."

Scott also remarks briefly on "the scene in which [Cassie] is attacked by an angry baboon. The baboon, at least, is unexpected, though also inexplicable."

References

External links 
 
 
 
 
 

2002 films
2002 crime thriller films
2002 psychological thriller films
American crime thriller films
Films directed by Barbet Schroeder
Films based on the Leopold and Loeb murder
Films shot in California
Films shot in Los Angeles
American police detective films
Castle Rock Entertainment films
Warner Bros. films
Films scored by Clint Mansell
Films produced by Barbet Schroeder
2000s English-language films
2000s American films